Billy Wesley (born October 26, 1971) is an American politician. He served as a Republican member for the 91st district of the Kentucky House of Representatives.

Wesley served in the United States Marine Corps. He worked for the Ravenna Police Department. In 2021, Wesley won the election for the 91st district of the Kentucky House of Representatives. He succeeded Cluster Howard. Wesley assumed his office on January 1, 2021. He decided to run for re-election for the 91st district.

References 

1971 births
Living people
Republican Party members of the Kentucky House of Representatives
21st-century American politicians